The Children of Theatre Street is a 1977 American documentary film about the Vaganova Academy of Russian Ballet directed by Robert Dornhelm and Earle Mack, narrated by Grace Kelly.

Reception
Time'''s Richard Schick wrote that The Children of Theatre Street "never quite gets up on point", stating that the story is told in "a straightforward, quite artless manner." The New York Times Janet Maslin also panned the movie, calling it "earnest, plodding and thoroughly earthbound, a fine illustration of how easy it is to demystify artistry by trying too hard to understand it."The Children of Theatre Street'' was nominated for an Academy Award for Best Documentary Feature.

Cast
 Angelina Armeiskaya as herself
 Michaela Cerna as herself
 Galina Mezenzewa as herself
 Konstantin Saklinsky as herself
 Alec Timoushin as himself
 Lena Voronzova as herself

References

External links

1977 films
1977 documentary films
1977 independent films
American documentary films
American independent films

Films directed by Robert Dornhelm
Documentary films about ballet
1970s English-language films
1970s American films